Oakland Hall is a historic home located near Moorefield, Hardy County, West Virginia. It was built about 1850, and is a Greek Revival style dwelling. It is the clubhouse for the Valley View Golf Club.

It was listed on the National Register of Historic Places in 1985.

References

External links
Valley View Golf Club website

Clubhouses on the National Register of Historic Places in West Virginia
Golf clubs and courses in West Virginia
Greek Revival houses in West Virginia
Houses completed in 1850
Houses in Hardy County, West Virginia
Houses on the National Register of Historic Places in West Virginia
National Register of Historic Places in Hardy County, West Virginia
1850 establishments in Virginia